FTM Fitness World is a company created in 2012 in Atlanta, Georgia, US, by Neo Sandja, a transgender man. In 2014, it launched its first annual conference, known as TransFitCon, dedicated to the transgender community. With its motto "Fitness for the mind, body and spirit", the idea was to create a 3-day conference where transgender people could improve their lives in five main areas: wellness (including health, fitness, and nutrition), spirituality, relationships, finances and personal development. The conference included the first historical bodybuilding competition for transgender people, won by Shawn Stinson, and added a powerlifting competition in the third year with Janae Marie Kroc as the powerlifting head judge.

In 2016, FTM Fitness World created a new branch, The International Association of Trans Bodybuilders, with its first official competition in 2017.

References

External links
 Official website
 The International Association of Trans Bodybuilders

Companies based in Atlanta
Privately held companies based in Georgia (U.S. state)
2012 establishments in Georgia (U.S. state)
LGBT culture in Atlanta
Transgender organizations in the United States
American companies established in 2012
Exercise organizations
LGBT health organizations in the United States
Trans men's culture